Alessandro Costantini (ca. 1581–1583, Staffolo – 20 October 1657, Rome) was an Italian baroque composer, maestro di cappella at the Collegium Germanicum. His surviving works include several Latin motets.

He and his brother, the composer , were pupils of Giovanni Bernardino Nanino.

References

17th-century Italian composers
Italian male composers
Italian organists
Male organists
1580s births
1657 deaths
Year of birth uncertain
17th-century male musicians